Pişmaniye (Bosnian: Ćetenija) is a Turkish and Bosnian sweet in fine strands made by blending flour roasted in butter into pulled sugar. It is sometimes garnished with ground pistachio nuts. Although it is sometimes compared to cotton candy, both the ingredients and method of preparation are significantly different.

Until recently pişmaniye used to be made at home in most regions of Turkey, but this tradition is now rapidly disappearing. Today the manufacturing process is partially mechanised.

Alternative names
There are many different Turkish names, used in different provinces, the most common being tel helva, çekme helva, tel tel, tepme helva and keten helva.

Origin and etymology
The earliest Turkish reference to pişmaniye is a recipe by Şirvani, a physician writing during the 1430s. "Pashm" in Persian means wool, and "Pashmak" means wool-like.

Another theory is that it may be of a Coptic origin from :'ⲡⲏⲥ: pis": which means :" to mix flour with fat" , and "ⲛⲏⲓⲛⲓ: nani or mani ": which means : "honey" , this candy found in Egypt, known as "halawat sha'ar حلاوة شعر"  which means : "hair candy".

See also
 Sutarfeni
 Soan papdi, a similar Indian sweet
 Pashmak
 Dragon's beard candy

References

External links

  Video of traditional hand-made technique filmed in a bazaar 
 Demonstration of modern mechanized equipment in the making of pişmaniye

Sugar confectionery
Halva